State Route 128 (SR 128) is a  state highway in Tallapoosa County. The highway's western terminus is at an intersection with SR 63. The route ends at the entrance to Wind Creek State Park along Lake Martin.

Route description
SR 128 is the signed route to provide access to Wind Creek State Park from SR 63. From SR 63, SR 128 heads east through wooded areas and enters the state park. The route turns east onto Hodnett Drive and ends a short distance later.

Major intersections

See also

References

External links

128
Transportation in Tallapoosa County, Alabama
Alexander City micropolitan area